Village banking is a microcredit methodology whereby financial services are administered locally rather than centralized in a formal bank. Village banking has its roots in ancient cultures and was most recently adopted for use by micro-finance institutions (MFIs) as a way to control costs. Early MFI village banking methods were innovated by Grameen Bank and then later developed by groups such as FINCA International founder John Hatch. Among US-based non-profit agencies there are at least 31 microfinance institutions (MFIs) that have collectively created over 800 village banking programs in at least 90 countries. And in many of these countries there are host-country MFIs—sometimes dozens—that are village banking practitioners as well.

Methodology
A village bank is an informal self-help support group of 20-30 members, predominantly female heads-of-household. If the program is “on mission”, in a normal village bank about 50% of all new members entering the program will be severely poor—representing families with a daily per-capita expenditure (DPCE) of less than US$1; the rest are moderately poor (DPCE=$1–2/day) or non-poor (DPCE >$2).  These women meet once a week in the home of one of their members to avail themselves of working capital loans, a safe place to save, skill training, mentoring, and motivation. Loans normally start at $50–$100 and are linked to savings such that the more a client saves the more she can borrow.  The normal loan period is four months and is repaid in 16 weekly installments. At the end of 2006, 95% of clients covered by a benchmark sample of 71 NGOs and institutions engaged in village bank lending were women.

To eliminate the need for collateral (the poor man's obstacle to receiving bank loans), village banks rely on a variation of the solidarity lending methodology. It relies on a system of cross-guarantees, where each member of a village bank ensures the loan of every other member. This system gives rise to an atmosphere of social pressure within the village bank, where the cost of social embarrassment motivates bank members to repay their loans in full. The admixture of cross-guarantees and social pressure makes it possible for even the poorest people to receive loans. This method has proven very effective for FINCA, yielding a repayment rate of over 97% in its worldwide network.  
Village banks are highly democratic, self-managed, grassroots organizations. They elect their own leaders, select their own members, create their own bylaws, do their own bookkeeping, manage all funds, disburse and deposit all funds, resolve loan delinquency problems, and levy their own fines on members who come late, miss meetings, or fall behind in their payments.

There was some hope in the early years of village bank development that these small village organizations could become independent and self-financing, but this hope was later abandoned.  Most village banks in operation today are directly supervised by the staff of a local NGO or microfinance institution, from which they receive much of their loan financing.

Sources of funds
Market interest rates apply to village bank loans.  At the end of 2006, the average portfolio yield for a sample 71 microfinance institutions engaged in village banking was 27.7%, after removing the effect of local inflation.  The village bank itself will usually mark up this rate when it on-lends to individual members.  While these rates seem high, they are low compared to those charged by local moneylenders in most countries.  Unlike rural banks and credit unions these microfinance institutions do not provide savings services directly to their clients.

The capital for the loans is provided by FINCA with on-time weekly installment repayments collectively guaranteed by all members—i.e., a shortfall by one member must be covered by other group members. This joint liability form of microcredit is controversial, with Muhammad Yunus (for example) rejecting formal systems of joint liability in Grameen Bank's solidarity groups.

FINCA
Worldwide FINCA’s 20 affiliates have a mostly-local staff of over 10,000 people, including credit officers and supervisors. Each credit officer attends the weekly meeting of each of her 10-15 village banks to coach its leadership committee and monitor the bank’s activities. In addition to motivation and adult education, the credit officer supervises client attendance, monitors bookkeeping accuracy, checks the accuracy of the current week’s loan and savings collections, and checks when the deposit receipt of the previous meeting. In turn, each village bank is managed by its elected officers—a president (who leads the bank’s democratic decision-making process), secretary (who takes attendance and keeps minutes) and a treasurer (responsible for accurately handling all cash transactions). Finally, each village banker has her own passbook, and her recorded balances of loan payments and savings deposits must always be the same as those recorded in the treasurer’s record for each client.

See also
 CVECA
 FINCA Afghanistan
 FINCA International
 flat rate (finance)
 John Hatch
 microcredit
 microfinance
 ROSCA
 Microcredit Summit Campaign
 self-help group
 solidarity lending

References

External links
 FINCA's Official Website

Microfinance
Banking
Credit
Rural development